, retitled  in North America and in the Japanese arcade re-release, is a scrolling shooter arcade video game by Konami. Released in 1986 as a spin-off of Gradius, Salamander introduced a simplified power-up system, two-player cooperative gameplay and both horizontally and vertically scrolling stages. Some of these later became normal for future Gradius games. In Japanese, the title is written using ateji, which are kanji used for spelling foreign words that has been supplanted in everyday use by katakana.

Salamander was followed with a sequel in 1996 titled Salamander 2.

Gameplay
The first player controls Vic Viper and the second player takes the reins of debuting spacecraft Lord British, which is sometimes referred to as "Road British" due to the ambiguity of Japanese-to-English romanization. The game features six stages which alter between horizontal and vertical scrolling.

Players are allowed to continue from where they leave upon death instead of being returned to a predefined checkpoint as per Gradius tradition. There are no continues in single player mode, and two in the two-player mode. The number of continues can be changed through DIP switches. The player gains power-ups by picking up capsules left behind by certain enemies, as opposed to the selection bar used in other Gradius games. However, the Japanese version of Life Force keeps the selection bar.

Many of the power-ups can be combined. For example, an option fires a second (or third) salvo of missiles or ripple/plutonic lasers if these power-ups have been attained. The ripple and laser, however, are mutually exclusive. The only power-up that can survive the ship's destruction is the options (called "multiples" in the English release), they followed the exact flight path of the player's ship and fired when they did, but were otherwise invulnerable. Upon the ship's destruction, the options float in space for a brief time before disappearing; the new ship can grab and retain them.

Development
The arcade version of the game was released under its original title in Japan and Europe, and as Life Force in North America. The Japanese and European versions are nearly identical, but the American version changes the game's plot by adding an opening text that establishes the game to be set inside a giant alien life-form which is infected by a strain of bacteria. Stages that feature starfield backgrounds were changed to the web background from Stage 1 to maintain consistency with the organic setting of the plot. The power-ups are also given different names, with the "Speed-Up" becoming "Hyper Speed", the "Missile" becoming the "Destruct Missile", the "Ripple Laser" becoming the "Pulse Laser" and "Force Field" becoming the "Shield". Narration is added to the beginning of each stage, detailing the area of the alien's body which the player is currently inhabiting such as "Enter stomach muscle zone" or "Bio-mechanical brain attack".

Konami later released an enhanced version of Salamander in Japan in 1987 bearing the American title of Life Force which further fleshes out the organic motif. All of the backgrounds and mechanical enemies are completely redrawn and given organic appearances. The power-up system was also modified, with the Japanese Life Force using the same power-up gauge as the original Gradius. Some music tracks have been completely changed for this release and the power-up gauge is arranged differently for both players.

Ports

Amstrad CPC, Commodore 64, and ZX Spectrum
Ocean Software on their Imagine label, released licensed versions of Salamander for computer systems by Spectrum, Commodore and Amstrad in 1988. The Spectrum and Amstrad versions were generally criticized, but the Commodore 64 version was highly praised by the critics of the day, particularly Zzap!64. Though missing two of the six stages, the simultaneous two player mode and gameplay being much easier than its arcade counterpart, the Commodore port is generally considered to be one of the best arcade conversions on this system.

Family Computer/Nintendo Entertainment System
Salamander was ported to the Family Computer in Japan in 1987. Instead of being a direct port of Salamander, elements were taken from the original Salamander and the Japanese Life Force re-release, and some elements, such as levels and bosses, were removed to make way for new content. Most of the background graphics and enemy sprites from Salamander are used in favor of those used in Life Force, though the Gradius-style power bar is used in place of the original instant pick-up system. The same year, North America received a port as well for the Nintendo Entertainment System. The NES version is practically identical to its Famicom equivalent, other than not having the multiple endings, having two option power ups instead of three, and being titled Life Force. The North America version was later re-released for the Virtual Console on February 16, 2009 for the Wii, on January 23, 2014 for the Nintendo 3DS and August 21, 2014 for the Wii U. The European version is titled Life Force: Salamander on its cover and was released on November 22, 1989. The NES version makes use of the Konami Code, which increases the number of lives from three to 30. The first two levels of Life Force were profiled in the second issue of Nintendo Power, issued in 1988. Several issues later the entire game was re-profiled.

MSX
New to this port is a graphical introduction that introduces human pilots for each ship, as well as names for each stage. The levels are notably longer than the arcade original, and the player is forced to start from a pre-defined checkpoint upon death of either pilot, instead of starting where he left off. After level two, the player can choose the order of the next three stages. In addition, the player can collect "E" capsules by destroying certain enemies. Collecting fifteen will permanently upgrade one of the available weapons on the power-up bar. Some weapons allow the player ships to merge, one player controlling movements and the second player controlling weapons. Instead of the Vic Viper and the Lord British Space Destroyer, the ships are known as the Sabel Tiger and the Thrasher; piloted by human characters named Iggy Rock and Zowie Scott. The story takes place in the year 6709 A.D and has 2 different endings. The MSX version was re-released for the Wii's Virtual Console in Japan on January 12, 2010. It was later released for the Wii U's Virtual Console on July 20, 2016. They were also made available for the Project EGG on Windows Store on May 19, 2015.

PC Engine
A version for the PC Engine was released on December 6, 1991. Based on the arcade version of Salamander, changes on this port include starting from a pre-defined checkpoint upon death in 1 Player mode, faster enemy animations, and improved music. In Japan, the PC Engine version was re-released for the Wii's Virtual Console on September 11, 2007, for PlayStation Network on July 21, 2010 and for the Wii U's Virtual Console on October 22, 2014, and also for the Project EGG con Windows Store on March 3, 2014. It was released in North America on November 16, 2017 for the Wii U Virtual Console. The PC version is on the  TurboGrafx-16 Mini released in 2020 and is the sole title from the compilation that is excluded from the Japanese model while being included in the North American and European ones.

PlayStation and Sega Saturn
A compilation titled Salamander Deluxe Pack Plus was released in Japan for the Sega Saturn on  June 19, 1997, and for the PlayStation on July 6 of the same year. The compilation includes Salamander, the Japanese version of Life Force, and Salamander 2. Konami announced that the PlayStation version would be released in the U.S. as part of a bundle with Gradius Gaiden, but this release was later cancelled.

Mobile Phones
Salamander was released for mobile phones in 2003.

PlayStation 4
All three arcade versions (Salamander, and the American and Japanese adaptations of Life Force) were ported to the Arcade Archives on November 27, 2015 in Japan exclusively for PlayStation 4. It was later released worldwide in Spring 2016. It was published by Hamster Corporation.

PlayStation Portable
Another compilation of the Salamander series, titled Salamander Portable, was released for the PlayStation Portable on January 24, 2007 in Japan. The PSP compilation features all three games previously included in the Salamander Deluxe Pack Plus, as well as Xexex and the MSX version of Gradius 2 (a.k.a. Nemesis II, which is unrelated to the arcade game Gradius II: Gofer's Ambition).

iOS
On December 20, 2010, an application called PC Engine Game Box was published in the App Store which served as a portal to download classic PC Engine video games. Among the downloadable titles is the PC Engine version of Salamander for a fee.

Arcade Classics Anniversary Collection
The arcade version is included on Konami's Arcade Classics Anniversary Collection released in April 2019 in digital-only format for the PlayStation 4, Xbox One, Nintendo Switch and PC. Initially, the compilation in Japan only had the Salamander version of the game, while everywhere else featured the American Life Force instead. In June 2019, Konami added for free the Japanese versions of the respective games on the western Arcade Classics Anniversary Collection. Only the Salamander version can be played in this addition, as the Japanese Life Force is not part of the compilation. Conversely, the American version of Life Force was added to the collection in Japan in that same update.

Reception

In Japan, Game Machine listed Salamander on their August 15, 1986 issue as being the second most successful table arcade unit of the month. It went on to be the top-grossing arcade game on Japan's Gamest charts between September and October 1986.

In 1997, Electronic Gaming Monthly rated the NES version the 76th best console video game of all time, calling it "one of the coolest shooters ever, and ... one of the first big two-player simultaneous shooters on the NES." They particularly noted that the graphics in the fire stage were "mind-blowing back in the day".

Anime

 is a 1988 OVA mini-series by Studio Pierrot, directed by Hisayuki Toriumi. There were three episodes released on VHS and Laserdisc between February 25, 1988 and February 21, 1989. The series was licensed by a British company Western Connection. The series is not canon, however; as the MSX Gradius series states that the events with Gofer take place over a two-hundred year period following the crisis with Zelos and his Salamander Armada. In this mini-series, it is revealed that the Bacterians capture sentient life to create leaders for their space armada. They capture sentient life via a dark fog going through space that changes inorganic matter into organic matter (the large brain-like final bosses in the games); and that they are a crystal-like life-form in origin. Noriko Hidaka provided the voice of the protagonist Stephanie. In the anime, the Lord British Space Destroyer was named after one of the protagonists, Ike Lord British of planet Latis; thus making it Lord British's Space Destroyer.

Releases
Vol. 1:  (based on Salamander)
Vol. 2:  (based on Gradius)
Vol. 3:  (based on Gradius II)

References

Bibliography

External links
  
 
 How to Play Life Force instruction manual
 
 Salamander anime  at DCTP 

1986 video games
Arcade video games
Amstrad CPC games
Commodore 64 games
Cooperative video games
D4 Enterprise games
Gradius video games
Konami franchises
Konami games
MSX games
Nintendo Entertainment System games
X68000 games
Horizontally scrolling shooters
TurboGrafx-16 games
ZX Spectrum games
Ocean Software games
NTDEC games
Mobile games
Video games scored by Mark Cooksey
Video games scored by Miki Higashino
Virtual Console games for Wii U
PlayStation 4 games
PlayStation Network games
Konami arcade games
Video games developed in Japan
Hamster Corporation games
Multiplayer and single-player video games